The U.S. African Development Foundation (USADF) is an independent U.S. government agency established by Congress in 1980 to invest directly in African grassroots enterprises and social entrepreneurs. USADF’s investments increase incomes, revenues, and jobs by promoting self-reliance and market-based solutions to poverty. USADF creates pathways to prosperity for marginalized populations and underserved communities in the Sahel, Great Lakes, and the Horn of Africa. It partners with African governments, other U.S. government agencies, private corporations, and foundations to achieve transformative results. 

The U.S. African Development Foundation measures grant success in terms of jobs created and sustained, household and enterprise incomes increased, and grantee organizations strengthened. For Fiscal Year 2021, Congress provided USADF $33 million to carry out activities.  

By the time of its 40th anniversary in December 2020, USADF had invested over $265 million via nearly 4,000 grants to African enterprises and impacted over 10 million lives. A study by Foreign Policy Analytics in 2020 determined that for every $10,000 in USADF grant funding in Africa, 25 workers are hired in the agriculture sector and 19 by youth-led enterprises, while 79 people are connected to electricity.

History
Created by an Act of Congress in 1980, the African Development Foundation began program operations in 1984. It has since provided financing to more than 1,700 small enterprises and community-based organizations.

1977 - Senators Edward Kennedy and George McGovern sponsored S. 1348, the African Development Foundation Act, in the 95th Congress. It proposed to amend the Foreign Assistance Act of 1961 to establish USADF to strengthen the bonds of friendship between the people of Africa and the United States and to assist in the development of Africa. It required such Foundation to cooperate with indigenous organizations representative of Africa and other private, regional, and international organizations. It also authorized such a Foundation to make grants, loans, and loan guarantees to African entities for developmental purposes and required the Foundation to give priority to community self-help projects with the maximum feasible participation of the poor. It also provided for the appointment of a Board of Directors to manage such a Foundation.  

1983 - The Senate Foreign Relations Committee held hearings on the nominations of William Pickard, Patsy Blackshear, Charles Wells, Chester Crocker, and Frank Ruddy to the USADF Board of Directors. The Senate confirmed the nominations that same year, during which the USADF Board held its first meeting at the offices of the Inter-American Foundation (IAF) in Virginia, USA.  

1984 - USADF began to develop its funding program in earnest in 1984, instituting the Foundation’s grants-making processes for sourcing, selecting , and supporting community-led enterprise growth projects and monitoring and evaluation. By September 1984, the USADF Board of Directors awarded grants to 11 grassroots organizations totaling $838,000. This first batch of USADF grants was issued in Botswana, Lesotho, Liberia, Mali, Niger, and Zambia.  

1985 – 1987 - USADF carried out its development model in 19 African countries, awarding over 100 grants totaling $10.3 million. By the end of 1987, USADF had developed accords or memorandums of understanding with nine African governments.  

1989 - Pastoralism was a major focus for USADF in the 1980s as a result of disastrous droughts in West Africa. In 1989, USADF hosted a Herders' Workshop, convening herders, farmers, and artisans from the Savannah and Sahelian zones in Ndutu, Tanzania, to foster learning and networks.  

1994 - In line with USADF's focus on promoting disability-inclusive development, the Foundation in 1994 brought together more than 60 persons with disabilities from 15 African countries in Kampala, Uganda. The attendees represented grassroots community groups and intermediary NGOs involved in horticulture, tailoring, furniture making, bookbinding, leadership and vocational training, and the reintegration of former psychiatric patients into communities. The meeting intended to promote and encourage the transitional process of persons with disabilities moving from a charity to an empowerment model.  

1996 - USADF re-activated its development activities in Rwanda in 1996 following the genocide there that claimed nearly a million lives in 1994. One of the early post-1996 grantees was Gahaya Links, a handicraft cooperative started by two Rwandan sisters who returned from being in Tanzania as refugees, with a group of Hutu and Tutsi women sitting around a circle, talking and making baskets together.  

1998 - USADF entered into its first host country government co-funding partnership in 1998 with the Republic of Botswana, through which USADF and the Government of Botswana provided matching funds for project grants that foster community-led economic development. Since this first co-funding government partnership, USADF has received over $34 million from African governments to implement community-enterprise programming in their countries, demonstrating a continued interest in partnering with USADF in support of peace and prosperity.  

2000 - On May 18, 2000, Congress enacted into law the African Growth and Opportunity Act (AGOA) as Public Law 106-200. The legislation significantly enhanced market access to the United States for sub-Saharan enterprises and organizations, including for USADF grantees that are increasingly export-ready and landing deals with major retailers such as Costco (cashews), Macy's (handicrafts), Target (shea butter cosmetics), and Whole Foods (textiles).   

2004 - President George W. Bush appointed Dr. Ephraim Batambuze and Jack Leslie to the USADF Board of Directors after the U.S. Senate confirmed their nominations. The two joined ADF's leadership as the Foundation implemented new strategic initiatives to expand trade and investment opportunities between Africa and the United States and to provide African communities with resources to prevent HIV/AIDS and mitigate its social and economic impact.   

2006 - Throughout the 2000s, USADF supported critical agriculture commodities, including paprika in Zimbabwe, red onions in Niger, vanilla in Uganda, sesame in Burkina Faso, shea in West Africa, and coffee across East Africa. USADF support of coffee cooperatives has facilitated several of them exporting premium coffee to the United States and Europe.  

2011 - USADF launched the Turkana Food Security Program in March 2011 with the strategic goal of boosting food security and reducing dependence on food aid in Turkana County, a highly marginalized, arid, and cattle raid-prone region of Kenya. USADF pledged $10 million in development grants and technical assistance; USADF met this goal, having awarded slightly more than USD $10 million to 53 agriculture and energy grantees in Turkana focused on mostly fishing, irrigated agriculture, and livestock. These projects have directly impacted more than 17,000 people (58% of whom were women) and indirectly benefitted more than 88,000 people.  

2012 - In Somalia, where nearly 70 percent of youth are unemployed, USADF is filling a skills gap by providing vocational training and job placement for youth between the ages of 15 and 35. USADF provides funding to local Somali NGOs to train unemployed youth and work with local businesses to set up five-month training and apprenticeship programs for the youth. Since 2012, USADF funding has facilitated placement for 6,000 youth. Dahabshiil Bank has provided funding alongside USADF that has facilitated 200 placements. Many of the youth participating in the training reported their income jumped from $50 a month to $300 a month. In 2020, USADF expanded youth training and apprenticeship to the Democratic Republic of the Congo, Lagos State in Nigeria, Senegal, South Sudan, and Uganda.  

2013 - The U.S. government’s Power Africa initiative was launched in 2013, bringing together technical and legal experts, the private sector, and governments from around the world to work in partnership to create 60 million new energy connections in sub-Saharan Africa by 2030. Following this launch, USADF began awarding renewable energy grants to SMEs and African entrepreneurs and has since awarded more than $11 million to over 115 African off-grid energy enterprises to help combat insufficient access to energy across the continent. To date, USADF has leveraged partnership funds from All On, GE, and Nithio Holdings for this portfolio and held various funding challenges in this sector, including USADF’s Women in Off-grid Energy Challenge, All On-USADF Off-grid Energy Challenge, and Sahel-Horn of Africa Off-grid Energy Challenge.   

2014 - Congress formally changed the Foundation’s name in 2014 from the African Development Foundation (ADF) to the United States African Development Foundation (USADF) to reinforce that USADF is a U.S. federal government agency and not an NGO and to further differentiate USADF from the African Development Fund and African Development Bank.  

2014 - USADF launched its youth entrepreneurship portfolio in 2014 by funding 35 young Africans to start or scale their social ventures. This initiative was part of the Mandela Washington Fellowship under the U.S. government’s Young African Leaders Initiative (YALI). Since launching the entrepreneurship portfolio, which aims to help social entrepreneurs create employment, USADF has provided catalytic funding to more than 300 African youth entrepreneurs.    

2020 - Through a partnership with Mastercard Lab for Financial Inclusion, USADF will empower thousands of smallholder farmers in Uganda by extending the reach of the Mastercard Farmer Network (MFN) platform, giving farmers digital access to markets, valuable inputs, financial services, and real-time pricing information. USADF and Mastercard in 2020 completed Phase I of the agriculture digitization pilot in Uganda and reached more than 13,000 farmers through two farmer producer organizations. USADF and Mastercard are created a follow-on Phase 11 to refine the model and scale its impact by reaching 300,000 farmers. 

2020 - As the COVID-19 pandemic threatened the progress USADF had made with grantees across Africa, USADF developed its COVID-19 response strategy in early 2020. The interventions have sought to respond by providing grantees immediate relief and capital assistance, support grantees in repurposing and reconfiguring business models, and building grantees' resilience. A key component of USADF's COVID-19 response is the Capital for African Resilience-building and Enterprises Support (C.A.R.E.S) initiative, through which the Foundation, by June 30, had provided approximately $3 million for over 330 grantees in 21 African countries. Grantees have used these funds to, among other things, manage increased transport costs, decreased production capacity, and insufficient storage for inputs and inventory. Additionally, USADF committed another $2 million to other sectors suitable to fight the pandemic’s effects by providing off-grid energy solutions for rural health clinics and isolation and treatment centers and providing grants to support the development of a Personal Protective Equipment (PPE) in Africa Coalition (alongside funding from the Western Union Foundation) to meet communities’ PPE needs. The Foundation also provided training to youth in Nigeria in healthcare sector jobs as part of its partnership with Lagos State.  

2020 - With the creation and implementation of its youth entrepreneurship summit, held in Kenya in 2018 and Senegal in 2019, USADF scratched the surface of the potential of its convening power. The Foundation enhanced its approach to leveraging its convening power in 2020, creating the Financing, Utilization, Networking in Development (FUND) Africa Summit. More than 200 people participated in the inaugural FUND Africa Summit, held in August 2020, as a virtual event due to COVID-19-related travel and gathering restrictions. FUND Africa provided a platform for notable speakers and subject matter experts to hold discussions with grantees on topics such as navigating the COVID-19 world, augmenting business models, and utilizing technology to find efficiency.  

2021 - USADF and the U.S. International Development Finance Corporation (DFC) established the Africa Small Business Catalyst (ASBC) – a partnership to promote investments in technology, innovation, and entrepreneurial solutions in African countries. This program combines DFC’s powerful financing tools (loans) with USADF’s on-the-ground presence and grant making-expertise. Under the partnership, USADF and DFC will provide loans between $50,000 and $500,000, accompanied by grants between $10,000 and $100,000 to African SMEs. 

2022 – USADF made several announcements, including on the margins of the 77th United Nations General Assembly and the U.S.-Africa Leaders Summit President Biden hosted. These include:  

A. The signing of a five-year, $20 million co-funding partnership with the Tony Elumelu Foundation focused on youth entrepreneurship and SME strengthening via investment toolkits 

B. The signing of a five-year, $10 partnership with the Government of Namibia’s Ministry of Industrialization and Trade to provide grant investments that enhance and strengthen the competitiveness of SMEs and ensure sustainable development of the rural economy in Namibia 

C. The launch of USADF Off-Grid Energy Challenges focused on energy for healthcare, energy for agriculture, and women in energy  

D. The expansion of the USADF and the National Basketball Players Association (NBPA) Foundation partnership to increase investment and development in Africa 

E. The launch of an annual Diaspora Award to provide funding for U.S.-based businesses owned and led by members of the African Diaspora to strengthen trade and investment relationships with African SMEs.

Operations
Working through a community-led development model, USADF provides grant capital of up to $250,000, capacity-building assistance, and convening opportunities to develop, grow, and scale African enterprises and entrepreneurs. These investments improve lives and impact livelihoods while addressing some of Africa's biggest challenges around food insecurity, insufficient energy access, and unemployment, particularly among women and youth. USADF utilizes 100 percent African staff and local partners on the ground across Africa, making it an agile, impactful, and innovative foreign assistance provider able to operate in areas that are often too remote or fragile to be reached by other U.S. government development agencies. 

The budget of USADF is funded through annual United States government appropriations for foreign operations. USADF maximizes taxpayer dollars by linking African host country government funds, corporate social investments, and U.S. Government interagency funding sources to achieve sustainable economic growth opportunities for grassroots, small, and growing enterprises in underserved regions across Africa. USADF has leveraged over $34 million from African governments.  

In Fiscal Year 2020, USADF awarded 253 new grants, investing primarily in early-stage agriculture, off-grid energy, and youth- and women-led enterprises and skills training programs. 

USADF is governed by a board of directors that includes seven members who are nominated by the president of the United States and confirmed by the United States Senate. The board of directors selects the USADF president and CEO, who manages the day-to-day activities of the foundation.  

USADF’s current countries of operations can be found on its webpage.

Programs
USADF’s program efforts in Africa align closely with Congressional priorities in development, trade and investment, youth and women economic empowerment, and the promotion of stability in fragile states and post-conflict regions. Between 2016-2021, USADF was a key contributor to the Global Food Security Act, providing over $61 million in 20 African countries to help approximately 3.4 million people overcome food insecurity. USADF works to improve food security and systems in 6 of 12 Feed the Future target countries.  

Since the passage of the Electrify Africa Act in 2014, USADF has invested more than $11 million in over 130 off-grid energy enterprises to help combat insufficient access to energy. On average, for every $10,000 USADF invests in off-grid energy enterprises, 79.3 people are connected to reliable electricity.  

Congress in 2019 passed into law the Global Fragility Act which focused on addressing the root causes of fragility and instability. Of USADF’s 21-country portfolio, 17 countries are classified as fragile or extremely fragile states by the OECD. USADF’s focus on supporting grassroots, community-led enterprises and its emphasis on youth and women entrepreneurs and development model dovetail with the Global Fragility Act’s requirement that “participatory, locally-led programs that empower marginalized groups such as youth and women” be a component of the Act’s Global Fragility Strategy. 

Since 2014, USADF has directly supported more than 300 youth entrepreneurs in 40 countries, providing them with a combined $6 million to launch and expand their businesses across Africa. These businessmen and women work across sectors, from health and education to IT and agribusiness to sell goods and services, create jobs, train youth, and increase incomes. A recent study of USADF’s youth entrepreneurship portfolio found that youth-led enterprise grantees in the Sahel reached an average of 12,570 beneficiaries or customers over the course of their grants and hired an average of 15 workers. In the Horn of Africa, youth enterprises reached 2,353 customers and hired an average of 273 workers. In the Great Lakes, USADF-funded youth entrepreneurs reached an average of 403 customers and hired an average of 9 workers. 

Types of USADF Grants  

USADF implements its model utilizing five primary grant types, which include:  

1) Operational Assistance Grant (OAG) - Many community enterprises in Africa require initial capacity building prior to pursuing expansion. OAGs are awarded to groups with a potential for longer-term growth and business success but require business planning, technology assessment, management, and financial systems development, market research, training, and technical assistance to position themselves for follow-on investment. Outputs from the OAG are a business plan, improved production and products, a defined market opportunity, an investment plan, improved management capacity, and a fully auditable set of business records. OAG grants are one to two years long and range from $25,000 to $100,000.  

2) Enterprise Expansion Grant (EEG) The EEG is the principal financing mechanism USADF utilizes to assist grantees with an established market and defined business strategy to scale up their activities. The purpose of the EEG is to assist grantees in generating increased revenues, increasing incomes, improving profitability, creating jobs, and positioning themselves for future investments. Applicants for an EEG must have a business track record that reflects a strong production capacity, market knowledge, quality products, and well-developed financial systems and records that will enable the applicant to obtain a USADF financial certification. EEG grants are typically three to four years in length and range from $100,000 to $250,000.  

3) Enterprise Linkage Grant (ELG) The Enterprise Linkage Grant was developed as a tool to position an enterprise to scale up operations by securing outside financing from targeted investors, donors and/or financial institutions. ELGs are awarded to groups that have built a strong organizational foundation and achieved significant revenue growth but are still considered too high-risk to secure traditional financing. USADF assists these grantees in identifying the financing criteria for one or more targeted funders, further developing the enterprise’s operations, and securing follow-on financing independent of USADF. ELG grants are six months to three years in length and average $57,000.  

4) Fixed Amount Awards (FAA) The Fixed Amount Award is a grant type USADF provides for a specific level of financial support where grant risks are identified and mitigated up front, and financial requirements are determined based on a defined set of milestones. The recipient’s accountability is based primarily on performance and results as determined by the achievement of established milestones. USADF’s off-grid energy and youth- and women-led enterprise grants fall within this category. FAAs are generally for a term not to exceed 18 months and range from $10,000 to $100,000.  

5) Community Reinvestment Grants (CRG) Community Reinvestment Grants are reimbursable grants for which a portion of grant funds are repaid and reinvested in local community organizations selected by the grantee, with USADF coordination and assistance as needed. A project undertaken through the reinvested funds must be directed at improving the overall quality of community life through social and economic advancement and improvements to community facilities and services. Grantees enter into their own agreements with recipients of the reinvested funds.

See also
 Title 22 of the Code of Federal Regulations

References and notes

External links 
 African Development Fund website

Independent agencies of the United States government